Komsomol is a rural locality (a selo) in Gafuriysky Selsoviet, Buzdyaksky District, Bashkortostan, Russia. The population was 316 as of 2010. There are 4 streets.

Geography 
Komsomol is located 11 km east of Buzdyak (the district's administrative centre) by road. Syrtlanovo is the nearest rural locality.

References 

Rural localities in Buzdyaksky District